George F. Bertsch (born 5 November 1942 in Oswego, New York) is an American nuclear physicist.

Bertsch received in 1962 his bachelor's degree from Swarthmore College and in 1965 his Ph.D. from Princeton University. In 1965–1966 he was a postdoc at the Niels Bohr Institute in Copenhagen. He was in 1966–1968 an instructor and in 1968–1971 an assistant professor at Princeton (with leave of absence in 1969–1970 when he was an assistant professor at Massachusetts Institute of Technology). He was in 1971–1974 an assistant professor and in 1974–1985 a full professor at Michigan State University. In 1985 he became a professor at the University of Washington in Seattle. From 1996 to 2005 he was editor-in-chief of Reviews of Modern Physics.

In Professor Bertsch's own words:

In 1978 he was elected a Fellow of the American Physical Society. For the academic year 2002–2003 he was a Guggenheim Fellow. In 2004 he was awarded the Tom W. Bonner Prize in Nuclear Physics.

Selected publications
 as editor: Nuclear Theory 1981 (Proceedings of the Nuclear Theory Summer Workshop, Santa Barbara 1981), World Scientific 1982
 as editor with D. Kurath: Nuclear Spectroscopy, Springer 1980 (Workshop Gull Lake Michigan 1979)
 The practitioner's shell model, Elsevier 1972 
 Nuclear Vibrations, Lecture Notes in Physics vol. 119, 1979, pp. 69
 with P. F. Bortignon, Ricardo A. Broglia: Damping of nuclear vibrations, Reviews of Modern Physics, vol. 55, 1983, pp. 287–314
 as editor with R. Broglia: Response of nuclei under extreme conditions, Plenum Press 1988 (Erice School 1986)
 
 with R. Broglia: Oscillations of finite quantum systems, Cambridge University Press 1994 ; 2005
 Vibrations of the atomic nucleus, Scientific American, May 1983
 with B. Mueller, J. Negele, J. Friar, V. Pandharipande: Nuclear theory white paper 1995
https://books.google.com

References

1942 births
Living people
21st-century American physicists
American nuclear physicists
Swarthmore College alumni
Princeton University alumni
Michigan State University faculty
University of Washington faculty
Fellows of the American Physical Society
People from Oswego, New York
Scientists from New York (state)